Maksar-e Olya (also Romanized as Maksar-e ‘Olyā and Moksar-e ‘Olyā; also known as Benvār-e Kūchek, Magsar, Magsar-e ‘Olyā, Maksar, Maksar-e Bālā, Mesgar, and Muksar) is a village in Jarahi Rural District, in the Central District of Mahshahr County, Khuzestan Province, Iran. At the 2006 census, its population was 165, in 41 families.

References 

Populated places in Mahshahr County